The 1822 Valparaíso earthquake was a major earthquake that occurred in Valparaíso, Chile on November 19, 1822. The earthquake has an estimated surface wave magnitude of 8.5. It triggered a moderate tsunami measuring up to  along the Chilean coast. The earthquake and tsunami killed between 72 and 300 people and left a further 200 injured.

Earthquake
Based on the historical accounts from Maria Graham, a British travel writer who documented her experience in the earthquake, seismologists concluded that the event was likely a result of thrust faulting. A deep section of the Peru-Chile subduction zone ruptured at a plausible depth of around 40 km. This depth is similar to the 2007 Tocopilla and 1906 Valparaíso earthquakes.

Damage
The earthquake was felt for as much as five minutes. In Concón, three distinct jolts were felt with the second being the most intense and lasting two minutes. A loud rumbling noise that seemed to be emanating from the ground was heard. The luminous activity was also seen in the sky during the quake. A canal connected to the Aconcagua River was buried and suffered cracks by collapsing debris when the riverbank failed.

In Quintero, palm trees were permanently deformed when the earthquake caused them to lean to one side. Nearly every home in the city was so badly damaged by the earthquake and resulting fire that residing in them was impossible. Near the Aconcagua River, the city Quillota also saw the destruction of many homes. Is it said that only 20 homes and a church survived the shocks.

Near Valparaíso, the city of Viña del Mar was near totally destroyed. Nearby cities including Limache and La Ligua were also damaged. In Valparaíso, the earthquake razed at least 700 private homes and countless public homes to the ground. The port area of the city suffered extensive damage because it was situated on loose alluvium. Many mud homes crumbled as a result. Most of the damaged structures were those constructed with bricks. Wooden and stone homes were either undamaged or lightly affected.

The violent shocks caused active mines to cave in and collapse, killing many workers.

Illapel and San Felipe also suffered severe damage. In Santiago, the earthquake was felt VII on the Mercalli intensity scale, causing damage to 30 buildings.

Quote

Tsunami
Three distinct waves struck the coast after the earthquake. A flagship used in rescue and recovery of the earthquake was carried by the first tsunami wave and stranded near the gates of a customs office. The surge retreated, leaving many vessels stranded on the seafloor. After a few minutes, two additional but weaker waves struck the coast.

See also
List of earthquakes in Chile
List of megathrust earthquakes

References 

Earthquakes in Chile
1822 in Chile
1822 disasters in Chile
November 1822 events
Tsunamis in Chile